St Mark's is a coeducational Church of England primary school in Talbot Village, Bournemouth, Dorset, England.

History 
The school was built in 1862, and designed by Christopher Crabb Creeke. In 1962, the schools centenary, the school saw a large expansion. The expanded building was officially opened by local Member of Parliament John Eden in March 1967.

The school became a Grade II listed building in 1972.

Connections 
The school is joined with the nearby St Mark's Church, and close to Bournemouth University.

References

External links 
 St Mark's C.E. Primary School

Church of England secondary schools in the Diocese of Salisbury
Schools in Bournemouth
Italianate architecture in England
Grade II listed buildings in Dorset
1862 establishments in England
Educational institutions established in 1862
Romanesque architecture in England
Primary schools in Bournemouth, Christchurch and Poole